Hypostomus asperatus is a species of catfish in the family Loricariidae. It is native to South America, where it occurs in the Tocantins River basin. The species reaches 22.9 cm (9 inches) in standard length and is believed to be a facultative air-breather.

References 

asperatus
Fish described in 1865